The C9 League is an alliance of nine universities in China, initiated by the Chinese Central Government to promote the development and reputation of higher education in China in 2009. Collectively, universities in the C9 League account for 3% of the country's researchers, but receive 10% of national research expenditures. They produce 20% of the nation's academic publications and 30% of total citations. People's Daily, an official newspaper of the Chinese Communist Party, refers to the C9 League as China's Ivy League. 

The C9 members are viewed as some of the most prestigious universities of all Chinese universities and consistently rank among the best in the world. All nine universities ranked in the top 11, including seven at the top of the 2021 Best Chinese University Rankings, a sub-ranking of Academic Rankings of World Universities (ARWU). Since 2019, Tsinghua University and Peking University have been ranked the two best universities in Asia-Oceania region and emerging countries, according to the THE World University Rankings. In the 2023 QS World University Rankings, Peking University and Tsinghua University rank in the top 15 globally (Peking 12th and Tsinghua 14th). 

The grouping has been compared to other elite university groupings around the world, such as the Ivy League, Russell Group, U15, and Group of Eight. LERU, Grande école, Imperial Universities, Institutes of National Importance, U15, SKY.

Membership
The C9 league comprises China's leading public research universities. Its members are: 
Fudan University, Shanghai
Harbin Institute of Technology, Harbin, Heilongjiang province
Nanjing University, Nanjing, Jiangsu province
Peking University, Beijing
Shanghai Jiao Tong University, Shanghai
Tsinghua University, Beijing
University of Science and Technology of China, Hefei, Anhui province
Xi'an Jiaotong University, Xi'an, Shaanxi province
Zhejiang University, Hangzhou, Zhejiang province

C9 League schools are allocated special resources, and have special arrangements for sharing resources with one another. They have a higher fraction of elite academics who have been awarded one of China's top academic honors, the Thousand Talents Plan Professorship and the Changjiang (Yangtze River) Professorship, and often have a few who have been awarded both.  C9 League schools receive substantial funding from both national and local governments in order to build new research centers, improve facilities, hold international conferences, attract world-renowned faculty and visiting scholars, and help Chinese faculty attend conferences abroad.

On November 7, 2014, the University of Chinese Academy of Sciences (UCAS) officially participated in the activities of the C9 League. The C9 Alliance’s standard will be used as a criteria for evaluating the external admissions score of the University of Chinese Academy of Sciences (UCAS), which has actually become a tenth member. However, it was not an official member. The Alliance is still called C9 League, which means that the total number of member universities is 9.

All the C9 League schools are members of several categories of national key universities, including the former Project 211, the former Plan 111, the former Project 985 and the current Double First Class University Plan, representing China's most prestigious universities.

Admissions 
The C9 members' undergraduate program is highly competitive. Seven of the C9 members are at the top as the hardest universities to get into, namely Peking University, Tsinghua University, Fudan University, Nanjing University, Zhejiang University, University of Science and Technology of China, and Shanghai Jiao Tong University. Only less than 0.2% of National Higher Education Entrance Examination ("Gaokao") takers get admitted every year (as a comparison to 0.6% of SAT-takers accepted in the five most selective Ivy League schools in 2012). Over ten million students take the Gaokao every year, and less than 2.2 million take the SAT: these rates are not directly comparable.

Rankings and reputation 
The C9 members are viewed as some of the most prestigious universities of all Chinese universities and consistently rank among the best in the world. All nine universities ranked in the top 11 nationwide, including seven at the top of the 2021 Best Chinese University Rankings, a sub-ranking of Academic Rankings of World Universities (ARWU). Since 2019, two of the C9 members (Tsinghua and Peking) have been the two best universities in the whole of Asia-Oceania region and emerging countries, according to the THE World University Rankings, THE Asia University Rankings and the THE Emerging Economies University Rankings. Moreover, the C9 league has dominated the QS BRICS University Rankings and the THE Emerging Economies University Rankings, claiming seven of the top 10 spots for both rankings. In the QS Asia University Rankings, five of the C9 universities appear in the Asia Top 10.

All the C9 members are ranked in the world's top 100 universities according to the Performance Ranking of Scientific Papers for World Universities, the University Ranking by Academic Performance, and the SCImago Rankings.  All the C9 members are ranked in the world's top 150 universities in the Academic Ranking of World Universities and the Nature Index Annual Tables. Seven of the C9 universities are ranked among the top 150 universities in the world according to the Academic Ranking of World Universities, the QS World University Rankings, the Times Higher Education World University Rankings and the U.S. News & World Report Best Global University Ranking. The C9 League as a grouping has been rapidly catching up with other elite groupings in terms of global rankings, even collectively passing Canada’s U15 and the UK's Russell Group within the ARWU league table in 2015.

Internationally, Tsinghua and Peking were regarded as the two most reputable Chinese universities by THE World Reputation Rankings, where they ranked 9th and 13th in the world as of 2022, respectively, together with Shanghai Jiao Tong and Fudan in the top 40, University of Science and Technology of China, Zhejiang and Nanjing in the top 100, and Xi'an Jiaotong and Harbin Institute of Technology in the global top 200 universities.

Tsinghua and Peking graduates are highly desired worldwide, with its Graduate Employability rankings placed at 6th and 19th in the world respectively in 2020 QS Graduate Employability Rankings, together with Fudan University, Shanghai Jiao Tong University, and Zhejiang University in the Global Top 50th Universities with high-achieving graduates every year.

All the C9 universities are ranked in the top 200 most international universities by the Times Higher Education Rankings.

International Connections 
The C9 League is a signatory member of the worldwide association of leading research universities, including the Association of American Universities (USA), the League of European Research Universities (Europe) and the Group of Eight (Australia), that signed the prestigious Hefei Statement (the ten characteristics of contemporary research universities) in 2013.

History

The Chinese government made several categories of national key universities in history. One of the earlier groups is the Project 211, which was established in 1995 to strengthen research standards in China’s top universities, with universities that exceed a threshold receiving significantly increased funds. By 2008, 116 higher education institutions were members of the Project 211.

Another more selective group is the Project 985, established in 1998. The Chinese government included 39 high-level research universities offering comprehensive and leading education in the Project 985, and capped their memberships to these 39 in 2011.

The most selective group is the C9 League, established by the Chinese central government at the 100th anniversary of Peking University on May 4, 1998, as part of the Project 985 with the goal of advancing Chinese higher education by formalizing an elite group of universities to foster better students and share resources. Nine universities were selected and allocated funding, and on October 10, 2009, the relationship between these nine universities was formalized into China's C9 League. Inspired by the C9 league universities, the Excellence League, a similar alliance of leading Chinese universities with strong backgrounds in engineering, was also established in 2010.

The current project, established in 2015, is the Double First Class University Plan to create 42 world-class universities by 2050.

In October 2015, the State Council of the People's Republic of China published the 'Overall Plan for Promoting the Construction of World First Class Universities and First Class Disciplines' (Double First Class University Plan), which made new arrangements for the development of higher education in China, comprehensively integrating previous projects including C9 League, Project 211, Project 985, etc. In September 2017, the full list of the universities and their disciplines of the Double First Class University Plan was released by the Ministry of Education of China, the Ministry of Finance of China and the National Development and Reform Commission of China. 

According to the list, 140 universities have been approved as ‘Double First Class Universities’ by the central government of China. The Double First Class University Plan underlines that driving the overall development of universities by building and strengthening their faculties and departments, and eventually developing the 140 listed elite universities into world-class universities by 2050.

See also
 List of universities in China
 Double First Class University Plan, a scheme for improving 147 China's top universities
 Excellence League, an alliance of leading Chinese universities with strong backgrounds in engineering
 Project 985, a former project for developing 39 leading research universities in China
 Project 211, a former program for developing 110 comprehensive universities in China
 Golden Triangle, a grouping of elite universities in the UK
 Russell Group, a formal grouping of advanced universities in the UK
 Ivy League, a formal grouping of elite private universities in the United States
 Association of American Universities (AAU), a formal grouping of the leading research universities in the United States 
League of European Research Universities, a formal grouping of the leading research universities in Europe 
BRICS Universities League, a consortium of leading research universities from BRICS countries 
The Grande Ecoles, in France, a formal league of public and private Universities in Business, Science, Engineering, Military strategy and Political Science under the aegis of the Conférence des grandes écoles (CGE), 
 Group of Eight, formal group of eight universities in Australia
 Imperial Universities, a grouping of elite older universities in Japan
 Institutes of National Importance, top public universities in India. 
 Maple League of Universities, a formal grouping of Canada's leading liberal arts undergraduate universities. 
 TU9, the alliance of nine leading Technical Universities in Germany
 U15, the group of 15 German Research Universities in Germany
 U15, the group of 15 Canadian Research Universities in Canada
 SKY (universities), a group of prestigious Korean universities
 Seven Sons of National Defence

Notes

References

C9 League
College and university associations and consortia in Asia
Higher education in China
Universities and colleges in China
Engineering universities and colleges in China
Professional associations based in China
Educational institutions established in 1998
1998 establishments in China